The Hands All Over Tour was the sixth concert tour by the American pop rock band Maroon 5, in support of their third studio album Hands All Over (2010). It began on February 16, 2011, in Bristol, England, and concluded on July 21, 2012, in Stateline, Nevada, comprising 61 concerts.

Opening acts
 Sara Bareilles
 Emily King
 Juliana Down
 Carolina Liar
 The Like
 Ry Cuming
 PJ Morton
 Javier Colon
 The Assembly Line
 Dave Dario
 Starliners

Setlist 

 "Misery"
 "If I Never See Your Face Again"
 "Harder to Breathe"
 "Give a Little More" 
 "The Sun"  
 "Won't Go Home Without You"
 "Never Gonna Leave This Bed" 
 "Secret" / "What's Love Got to Do with It" 
 "Wake Up Call" 
 "She Will Be Loved" 
 "Shiver"
 "Stutter" 
 "Makes Me Wonder"
 "This Love" 
Encore

Shows

Cancelled shows

Notes

References

2011 concert tours
2012 concert tours
Maroon 5 concert tours
Concert tours of North America
Concert tours of South America
Concert tours of the United States
Concert tours of Asia
Concert tours of Europe